Cindy Chala (born 17 May 1991) is a former professional French tennis player. On 14 June 2010, she reached her highest WTA singles ranking of 439.

Career
Chala had a successful junior career. Her career-high ranking as a junior was world No. 11. In 2007, Chala won a prestigious tournament for juniors Porto Alegre Junior Championships (Grade A) She won one singles title and one doubles title on the ITF Women's Circuit.
She is two times French Champion, in 2007 and 2009.

She decided to follow the college route and was part of the VCU Rams tennis team from 2012 to 2015.

ITF Junior Circuit finals

Singles (2–2)

Doubles (2–1)

References

1991 births
Living people
French female tennis players
VCU Rams athletes
Sportspeople from Saint-Cloud
French expatriate sportspeople in the United States
College women's tennis players in the United States